Samer Abu Hawwash (born 1972) is a Palestinian writer and translator. He was born in Lebanon to a Palestinian refugee family. He has published around ten volumes of poetry, starting with his debut collection Life is Printed in New York (1997). He is also a prolific translator of English-language fiction and non-fiction. Among his notable translations are works by Charles Bukowski, Langston Hughes, Jack Kerouac, Yann Martel, Hanif Kureishi, Denis Johnson and Marilynne Robinson. 

He lives in the UAE.

References

Palestinian writers
1972 births
Living people